Sendler is a surname, variant of Sandler. Notable people with the surname include:

Irena Sendler (1910–2008), Polish social worker, humanitarian and Holocaust rescuer
Egon Sendler (born 1923), German-French art historian

See also 

Yiddish-language surnames